Detalik idanrensis is the type species of jumping spider in the genus Detalik. The female was first described by Wanda Wesołowska in 2021 in Nigeria.

References

Endemic fauna of Nigeria
Salticidae
Spiders described in 2021
Spiders of Africa
Taxa named by Wanda Wesołowska